Freshwater snails are gastropod mollusks that live in fresh water. There are many different families. They are found throughout the world in various habitats, ranging from ephemeral pools to the largest lakes, and from small seeps and springs to major rivers. The great majority of freshwater gastropods have a shell, with very few exceptions. Some groups of snails that live in freshwater respire using gills, whereas other groups need to reach the surface to breathe air. In addition, some are amphibious and have both gills and a lung (e.g. Ampullariidae).  Most feed on algae, but many are detritivores and some are filter feeders.

According to a 2008 review of the taxonomy, there are about 4,000 species of freshwater gastropods (3,795–3,972).

At least 33–38 independent lineages of gastropods have successfully colonized freshwater environments. It is not possible to quantify the exact number of these lineages yet, because they have yet to be clarified within the Cerithioidea. From six to eight of these independent lineages occur in North America.

Taxonomy

2005 taxonomy 
The following cladogram is an overview of the main clades of gastropods based on the taxonomy of Bouchet & Rocroi (2005), with families that contain freshwater species marked in boldface: (Some of the highlighted families consist entirely of freshwater species, but some of them also contain, or even mainly consist of, marine species.)

2010 taxonomy 
The following cladogram is an overview of the main clades of gastropods based on the taxonomy of Bouchet & Rocroi (2005), modified after Jörger et al. (2010) and simplified with families that contain freshwater species marked in boldface: (Marine gastropods (Siphonarioidea, Sacoglossa, Amphiboloidea, Pyramidelloidea) are not depicted within Panpulmonata for simplification. Some of these highlighted families consist entirely of freshwater species, but some of them also contain, or even mainly consist of, marine species.)

Neritimorpha 
The Neritimorpha are a group of primitive "prosobranch" gilled snails which have a shelly operculum.

Neritiliidae, 5 extant freshwater species
Neritidae, largely confined to the tropics, also the rivers of Europe, family includes the marine "nerites". There are about 110 extant freshwater species.

Caenogastropoda 
The Caenogastropoda are a large group of gilled operculate snails, which are largely marine. In freshwater habitats there are ten major families of caenogastropods, as well as several other families of lesser importance:

Architaenioglossa
Ampullariidae, an exclusively freshwater family that is largely tropical and includes the large "apple snails" kept in aquaria. 105–170 species.
Viviparidae, medium to large snails, live-bearing, commonly referred to as "mystery snails".  Worldwide except South America, and everywhere confined to fresh waters. 125–150 species.

Sorbeoconcha
Melanopsidae, family native to rivers draining to the Mediterranean, also Middle East, and some South Pacific islands. About 25–50 species.
Pachychilidae - 165–225 species. native to South and Central America.  Formerly included with the Pleuroceridae by many authors. 
Paludomidae - about 100 species in south Asia, diverse in African Lakes, and Sri Lanka. Formerly classified with the Pleuroceridae by some authors.
Pleuroceridae, abundant and diverse in eastern North America, largely high-spired snails of small to large size. About 150 species.
Semisulcospiridae, - primarily eastern Asia, Japan, also the Juga snails of northwestern North America. Formerly included with the Pleuroceridae. About 50 species.
Thiaridae, high-spired parthenogenic snails of the tropics, includes those referred to as "trumpet snails" in aquaria. About 110 species.

Littorinimorpha
Littorinidae - 9 species in the genus Cremnoconchus are freshwater living in streams and waterfalls. Other species are marine.
Amnicolidae - about 200 species.
Assimineidae - about 20 freshwater species, other are marine
Bithyniidae, small snails, native to Eastern Hemisphere. About 130 species.
Cochliopidae - 246 species.
Helicostoidae, the only species Helicostoa sinensis lives in China.
Hydrobiidae, small to very small snails found worldwide. About 1250 freshwater species other are marine.
Lithoglyphidae - about 100 species.
Moitessieriidae - 55 species.
Pomatiopsidae, small amphibious snails scattered worldwide, most diverse in eastern and Southeast Asia. About 170 species.
Stenothyridae - about 60 freshwater species, others are marine.

Neogastropoda
Nassariidae - 8–10 freshwater species in the genus Anentome and Clea, native to Southeast Asia. Other Nassariidae are marine.
Marginellidae - 2 freshwater species in the genus Rivomarginella, native to Southeast Asia.  Other Marginellidae are marine.

Heterobranchia 

Lower Heterobranchia
Glacidorbidae - 20 species. 
Valvatidae, small low-spired snails referred to as "valve snails". 71 species.

Acochlidiacea
Acochlidiidae (including synonym Strubelliidae) - 5 shell-less species: Acochlidium amboinense, Acochlidium bayerfehlmanni, Acochlidium fijiiensis, Palliohedyle sutteri and Strubellia paradoxa
Tantulidae - there is only one species which is shell-less Tantulum elegans.

Pulmonata, Basommatophora
Basommatophorans are pulmonate or air-breathing aquatic snails, characterized by having their eyes located at the base of their tentacles, rather than at the tips, as in the true land snails Stylommatophora. The majority of basommatophorans have shells that are thin, translucent, and relatively colorless, and all five freshwater basommatophoran families lack an operculum.

Chilinidae, small to medium-sized snails confined to temperate and cold South America. About 15 species.
Latiidae, small limpet-like snails confined to New Zealand. One or three species.
Acroloxidae - about 40 species.
Lymnaeidae, found worldwide, but are most numerous in temperate and northern regions. These are the dextral (right-handed) pond snails. About 100 species.
Planorbidae, "rams horn" snails, with a worldwide distribution. About 250 species.
Physidae, left-handed (sinistral) "pouch snails", native to Europe, Asia, North America. About 80 species.

Sexual reproduction and self-fertilization

The freshwater snail Physa acuta is in the subclass Heterobranchia and the family Physidae. P. acuta is a self-fertile snail that can undergo either sexual reproduction or self-fertilization. Inbreeding promotes the homozygous expression of deleterious recessive mutations in progeny that then exposes these mutations to selective elimination because of their deleterious affects on progeny. Outbreeding sexual reproduction allows females to choose male mating partners with smaller mutation loads that then also leads to a reduction of deleterious mutations in progeny. On the basis of their findings, Noel et al. concluded that both outbred and inbred populations of P. acuta can efficiently eliminate deleterious mutations.

As human food 
Several different freshwater snail species are eaten in Asian cuisine.

Archaeological investigations in Guatemala have revealed that the diet of the Maya of the Classic Period (AD 250–900) included freshwater snails.

Aquarium snails 
Freshwater snails are commonly found in aquaria along with tropical fish.  Species available vary in different parts of the world.  In the United States, commonly available species include ramshorn snails such as Planorbella duryi, apple snails such as Pomacea bridgesii, the high-spired thiarid Malaysian trumpet snail, Melanoides tuberculata, and several Neritina species.

Parasitology 

Freshwater snails are widely known to be hosts in the lifecycles of a variety of human and animal parasites, particularly trematodes or "flukes". Some of these relations for prosobranch snails include Oncomelania in the family Pomatiopsidae as hosts of Schistosoma, and Bithynia, Parafossarulus and Amnicola as hosts of Opisthorchis.  Thiara and Semisulcospira may host Paragonimus. Juga plicifera may host Nanophyetus salmincola. Basommatophoran snails are even more widely infected, with many Biomphalaria (Planorbidae) serving as hosts for Schistosoma mansoni, Fasciolopsis and other parasitic groups. The tiny Bulinus snails are hosts for Schistosoma haematobium. Lymnaeid snails (Lymnaeidae) serve as hosts for Fasciola and the cerceriae causing swimmer's itch. The term "neglected tropical diseases" applies to all snail-borne infections, including schistosomiasis, fascioliasis, fasciolopsiasis, paragonimiasis, opisthorchiasis, clonorchiasis, and angiostrongyliasis.

See also
 Terrestrial molluscs
 Land snail
 Land slug
 Sea snail
 Sea slug

References 
This article incorporates CC-BY-2.5 text from the reference

Further reading 
 J. Mouthon, Typology of molluscs of flowing water; biotypological organisations; socioecological groupings; Annls Limnol. Volume 17, Number 2, 1981
 Haynes A. (2000). "The distribution of freshwater gastropods on four Vanuatu islands: Espiritu Santo, Pentecost, Éfate and Tanna (South Pacific)". Annales de Limnologie 36(2): 101–111. , PDF.
 Vermeij J. & Wesselingh F. P. (2002). "Neogastropod molluscs from the Miocene of western Amazonia, with comments on marine to freshwater transitions in molluscs". Journal of Paleontology 76(2): 265–270. .
 >J.B. Burch, Freshwater snails of North America; 1982 - nepis.epa.gov

 
Mollusc common names